These California land grants were made by Spanish (1784–1821) and Mexican (1822–1846) authorities of Las Californias and Alta California to private individuals before California became part of the United States of America. Under Spain, no private land ownership was allowed, so the grants were more akin to free leases. After Mexico achieved independence, the Spanish grants became actual land ownership grants. Following the Mexican–American War, the 1848 Treaty of Guadalupe Hidalgo provided that the land grants would be honored.

Alta California ranchos in Mexico
From 1773 to 1836, the border between Alta California and Baja California was about 30 miles south of the Mexico–United States border drawn by the Treaty of Guadalupe Hidalgo that ended the Mexican–American War in 1848.

Under the Siete Leyes constitutional reforms of 1836, the Alta California and Baja California territories were recombined into a single Las Californias "department", with a single governor. None of the rancho grants near the former border, however, were made after 1836, so none of them straddled the pre-1836 territorial border.

The result of the shifting borders is that some of the ranchos in this list, created by pre-1836 governors, are located partially or entirely in a 30-mile-wide sliver of the former Alta California that is now in Mexico rather than in the U.S. state of California. Since those ranchos remained in Mexico, in today's Mexican state of Baja California, the grants were not subject to review by the Public Land Commission except for Rancho Tijuan that had claimed part of its lands were on the American side of the border.

List of ranchos of California

Notes

References

See also
 Ranchos of California
 Mexican land grants in Texas
 List of California Rancherias
  – Spanish + Mexican California.
 
 

Ranchos
Ranchos
Ranchos, California
California ranchos

Ranchos